Nicolás "Nico" Serrano Galdeano (born 5 March 2003) is a Spanish professional footballer who plays as a winger for CD Mirandés, on loan from Athletic Bilbao.

Club career
Born in Pamplona, Navarre, Serrano joined Villarreal CF's youth setup in 2015, aged 12, after representing UDC Txantrea and CA Osasuna. In August 2018, at the age of 15, he signed for Athletic Bilbao.

In May 2020, after finishing his formation, Serrano was promoted straight to the reserves, without playing for CD Basconia, the farm team, and signed a professional contract late in the month. He made his senior debut on 18 July, coming on as a second-half substitute for Juan Artola in a 1–1 home draw against CD Badajoz, in the 2020 Segunda División B play-offs.

Serrano scored his first senior goal on 7 November 2020, netting the opener in a 2–1 home win over SD Amorebieta. In June of the following year, he was called up by manager Marcelino to make the pre-season with the main squad.

Serrano made his first team – and La Liga – debut on 11 September 2021, replacing Iñaki Williams late into a 2–0 home win over RCD Mallorca. On 11 August of the following year, he was loaned to Segunda División side CD Mirandés for the season.

International career
Serrano represented Spain at under-16, under-17 and under-18 levels.

Career statistics

Club

References

External links

2003 births
Living people
Footballers from Pamplona
Spanish footballers
Association football wingers
La Liga players
Primera Federación players
Segunda División B players
Tercera División players
CD Basconia footballers
Bilbao Athletic footballers
Athletic Bilbao footballers
CD Mirandés footballers
Spain youth international footballers